Cloniprazepam is a benzodiazepine derivative and a prodrug of clonazepam, 7-aminoclonazepam, and other metabolites.

Some of the minor metabolites include 3-hydroxyclonazepam and 6-hydroxyclonazepam, 3-hydroxycloniprazepam and ketocloniprazepam with ketone group formed where 3-hydroxy group was.

It is a designer drug and an NPS (short for "new psychoactive substance"). At the end of 2017, cloniprazepam was an uncontrolled substance in most of the countries.

See also 
 Flutoprazepam
 Ro05-4082
 List of designer drugs
 List of benzodiazepines
 List of benzodiazepine designer drugs

References

External links 
 https://www.unodc.org/LSS/Substance/Details/d115de07-ab8f-4454-a8f7-3ea15f4a0748
 https://web.archive.org/web/20160623204002/http://nsddb.eu/substance/590/

Anticonvulsants
Anxiolytics
Nitrobenzodiazepines
Designer drugs
GABAA receptor positive allosteric modulators
Prodrugs
Chlorobenzenes
Cyclopropanes